The Rock-carved triad buddha in Seosan is located at Gayasan, Unsan-myeon, Seosan, Chungcheongnam-do. The Standing Buddha Reborn was sculptured in the center which is 208 centimeter high, with a standing image of a bodhisattva on his right side and an image of the Bangasayusang on his left side. It is also known as "the smile of the Baekje", and it is considered to be a notable example of Buddhist images carved on rock cliffs and which were made by digging into the natural rocks and sculpting the statue.

Features
The Standing Buddha Reborn has a fleshy face, eyes "like an apricot pit," a shallow, large nose and a smiling mouth. It displays the merciful impression which is a feature of statues of Baekje kingdom. Because his robe is thick, it doesn’t show his silhouette and has folds of repeated U-patterns. At the back of the head the round halo-like nimbus has lotus flowers inscribed in its center and flame patterns at the border.

On the left of the carving, the standing bodhisattva is wearing a crown. He has a chubby face like the image of the principal Buddha and seems to be smiling with his entire face. His upper body is decorated with a necklace and his lower body is covered with a skirt that extends to his ankles.

On the right side, the sitting bodhisattva also smiles with his entire face, which is round and fleshy. Both of his arms were seriously damaged, but it still displays sophisticated carving skills in his left hand grasping his right ankle and his jaw resting in his right hand.

It is believed that the carving is an expression of the principal Buddha and Maitreya bodhisattva introduced in the "Lotus Sutra". It is estimated to have been created between the late 6th and the early 7th centuries, due to the commonness in that period of heavy, dignified physiques and the round, clear cuts exhibited in the principal Buddha statue, and the refined sense of molding in the bodhisattva statue, as well as the liveliness of the image.

Cultural significance
This area was a passage through the Taean peninsula which was a center of traffic traveling to and from China and the Baekje and Buyeo kingdoms. As such, this artwork is considered to show the active cultural exchange between China and Baekje.

Factsheet

See also
 National Treasures of South Korea
 Baekje
 Seosan
 Korean Buddhist sculpture
 Korean Buddhism

References

External links
 Arts of Korea, an exhibition catalog from The Metropolitan Museum of Art Libraries (fully available online as PDF), which contains material on this National Treasure

Seosan
Buildings and structures in South Chungcheong Province
National Treasures of South Korea
Three Kingdoms of Korea
Tourist attractions in South Chungcheong Province
Buddhist sculpture